37th Regiment or 37th Infantry Regiment may refer to:

 37 (Wessex and Welsh) Signal Regiment, a unit of the United Kingdom Army
37th Infantry Regiment (United States)
 37th Armor Regiment (United States), a unit of the United States Army
 Combat Logistics Regiment 37, a unit of the United States Marine Corps 

 American Civil War Regiments 
 37th Illinois Volunteer Infantry Regiment
 37th Iowa Volunteer Infantry Regiment
 37th New Jersey Volunteer Infantry Regiment
 37th Wisconsin Volunteer Infantry Regiment

See also
 37th Division (disambiguation)
 37th Brigade (disambiguation)
 37th Squadron (disambiguation)